Selangor Turf Club is a horse racing track located in Serdang, Selangor, Malaysia. It is one of three horse racing courses in the country; the other two are in Ipoh, Perak and Penang.

History
Selangor Turf Club was founded in 1896. For nearly a century, races were conducted at Ampang Road, which is today the site of Petronas Twin Towers. 

In 1993 the Club relocated to its present site in Serdang while its previous Ampang Road racecourse made way for the KLCC/Petronas Towers project.

Triple Crown Series 
The Selangor Turf Club Triple Crown race series comprises the three Malaysian Group 1 races run at Selangor throughout the year.

 Tunku Gold Cup (G1) 1200m RM 200,000 (Appox US$51,000)
 Selangor Gold Cup (G1) 1600m  RM 200,000 (Appox US$ 51,000)
 Piala Emas Sultan Selangor (G1) 2000m RM 400,000 (Appox US$96,000)

However, since its inception in 2003, no horse has won the Triple Crown series. In 2005 Superb Classic trained by Cecil Robert won the first two legs of the series which is as close as any horse has got to winning the Triple Crown.

Race tracks 
The Main Racing Track can cater for distances ranging from 1,200 to 2,400 metres races and 25 metres width and is a left-handed oval-shaped grass track turfed with Zoysia El-Toro turf.  The Zoysia El-Toro turf track has a deep-rooted system, which provides a cushion effect for the horses.  The track is made up of a profile that incorporates a base drainage layer of gravel perforated by sub-soil pipes with a lower layer of sand and an upper root zone layer.  The lower layer helps in the fast drainage of water.

The sand, gravel layer and sub-soil pipes provide a quick and efficient draining of water even during the heavy rainfall.  It is very rare to find the Main Racing Track condition going below yielding and even if it does drop to yielding zone, the track would recover to its good going in no time.

The unique feature of this track is the two elevated bends cambered at an angle of 1 in 11, which enables horses to gallop at full speed into the bend thus gaining momentum before heading for the home straight.  This ideal camber has been known to enhance the competitiveness while giving fair opportunity to all the runners regardless of the drawn barrier of the horse.

Admission 
Entrance ticket to the Grandstand can be purchased on the day at the Ticketing Booth located at the Public Entrance Hall. The cost of ticket is RM6 per entry and RM20 for the Public Air-Conditioner Enclosure. Selangor Turf Club does not provide advance purchases of entrance ticket/s and on-line booking.

Racing fans attending races at the Sungei Besi Racecourse are to park at the Public Car Park. The cost of parking is RM7.00 per entry.

For those who want privacy and comfort, check out the exclusive Corporate Boxes overlooking the racetrack that comes equipped with advanced audio-visual installations and catering facilities in a nice and cozy ambience. For smaller groups, the Racing Package may just be your answer to enjoy the races.

Lunch package price starts from RM170 per person. Racing Package includes admission fee to the private air-conditioner enclosure. Racing Package excludes beverages.

Location and transport
Selangor Turf Club is located in Serdang, just outside the southern border of the Federal Territory of Kuala Lumpur. By car it is accessible via exit 904 of Besraya toll road , then turn left into Jalan Kuda Emas.

From PLUS , Selangor Turf Club is accessible via the second exit (north-bound) after the Sungai Besi toll emptying into Bukit Jalil Highway (highway 217).

The closest railway stations are Serdang Raya Utara MRT station on the  line, Sungai Besi LRT station on the  line and Serdang Komuter station on the KTM Komuter  line.

References

External links
Selangor Turf Club website

1896 establishments in British Malaya
Petaling District
Turf clubs in Malaysia
Cricket grounds in Malaysia
Sports venues in Selangor